Isakovka is a rural locality (a village) in Mstyora Urban Settlement, Vyaznikovsky District, Vladimir Oblast, Russia. The population was 5 as of 2010.

Geography 
Isakovka is located on the Tara River, 28 km northwest of Vyazniki (the district's administrative centre) by road. Krutovka is the nearest rural locality.

References 

Rural localities in Vyaznikovsky District